Firthcliffe is a hamlet (and census-designated place) in Orange County, New York United States. The population was 5,022 at the 2020 Census. It is part of the Poughkeepsie–Newburgh–Middletown, NY Metropolitan Statistical Area as well as the larger New York–Newark–Bridgeport, NY-NJ-CT-PA Combined Statistical Area.

Firthcliffe is in the Town of Cornwall.

Geography
Firthcliffe is located at  (41.440084, -74.033783).

Firthcliffe is named after the now defunct Firth Carpet Company, located on Mill Street, that built many of the homes on Firth street in the Firthcliffe area of the Town of Cornwall.

Demographics

As of the census of 2000, there were 4,970 people, 1,965 households, and 1,349 families residing in the CDP. The population density was 1,649.0 per square mile (637.5/km2). There were 2,065 housing units at an average density of 685.1/sq mi (264.9/km2). The racial makeup of the CDP was 94.35% White, 1.19% African American, 0.12% Native American, 1.11% Asian, 1.41% from other races, and 1.83% from two or more races. Hispanic or Latino of any race were 6.32% of the population.

There were 1,965 households, out of which 34.9% had children under the age of 18 living with them, 55.6% were married couples living together, 9.9% had a female householder with no husband present, and 31.3% were non-families. 27.7% of all households were made up of individuals, and 13.7% had someone living alone who was 65 years of age or older. The average household size was 2.51 and the average family size was 3.10.

In the CDP, the population was spread out, with 27.0% under the age of 18, 5.3% from 18 to 24, 29.9% from 25 to 44, 22.9% from 45 to 64, and 15.0% who were 65 years of age or older. The median age was 38 years. For every 100 females, there were 87.0 males. For every 100 females age 18 and over, there were 82.8 males.

The median income for a household in the CDP was $55,125, and the median income for a family was $65,795. Males had a median income of $46,742 versus $32,476 for females. The per capita income for the CDP was $24,894. About 4.4% of families and 6.7% of the population were below the poverty line, including 10.7% of those under age 18 and 4.6% of those age 65 or over.

References

Census-designated places in New York (state)
Cornwall, New York
Hamlets in New York (state)
Poughkeepsie–Newburgh–Middletown metropolitan area
Census-designated places in Orange County, New York
Hamlets in Orange County, New York